Stawy may refer to the following places:
Stawy, Greater Poland Voivodeship (west-central Poland)
Stawy, Łódź Voivodeship (central Poland)
Stawy, Świętokrzyskie Voivodeship (south-central Poland)
Stawy, Lubusz Voivodeship (west Poland)
Stawy, Opole Voivodeship (south-west Poland)